The 1820 Connecticut gubernatorial election was held on April 13, 1820. Incumbent governor and Toleration Party candidate Oliver Wolcott Jr. was re-elected, defeating Federalist Party candidates former delegate Nathan Smith and former congressman and state legislator Timothy Pitkin with 76.14% of the vote.

General election

Candidates
Major candidates

Oliver Wolcott Jr., Toleration
Nathan Smith, Federalist
Timothy Pitkin, Federalist

Results

References

1820
Connecticut
Gubernatorial